Strother Field  is a public airport in Cowley County, Kansas, six miles southwest of Winfield and north of Arkansas City. The airport is jointly owned by the two cities. The National Plan of Integrated Airport Systems for 2011–2015 categorized it as a general aviation facility.

History 

An airport, jointly owned by Arkansas City and Winfield, was under construction in April 1942 when the United States Army Air Forces indicated a need for a training airfield by the Army Air Forces Flying Training Command, Gulf Coast Training Center. Strother Army Airfield was rushed to completion with the first class of cadets scheduled to arrive for basic training in Vultee BT-13 Valiant aircraft on December 14, 1942.

Military use of Strother Field ended in October 1945 and it was turned over for civil use. Today, the site is Strother Field and Industrial Park. Remaining wartime structures include the runways, two hangars, two link training buildings, a tetrahedron wind cone, two ruins sites and a building of unknown original use.

The airport is named for Donald Root Strother, the first Army Air Corps pilot from Cowley County, Kansas to lose his life in World War II. His older brother Dean C. Strother became a four-star general in the United States Air Force.

Winfield had scheduled Central Airlines flights in 1950–53. on Bonanzas, then DC-3s.

Facilities
Strother Field covers 1,530 acres (619 ha) at an elevation of 1,160 feet (354 m). It has two asphalt runways: 17/35 is 5,506 by 100 feet (1,678 x 30 m) and 13/31 is 3,137 by 75 feet (956 x 23 m).

Strother field's industrial park includes a jet engine maintenance and manufacturing facility for GE Aviation.

In the year ending November 19, 2008 the airport had 6,500 general aviation aircraft operations, average 17 per day. 18 aircraft were then based at the airport: 83% single-engine, 11% ultralight, and 6% multi-engine.

References

External links 
 Strother Field Industrial Park, Winfield, Kansas
 Historical building inventory of Strother Field, 2008
 Aerial image as of March 1996 from USGS The National Map
 

Airports in Kansas
Buildings and structures in Cowley County, Kansas
1942 establishments in Kansas
Airports established in 1942